Francesca Faridany (born July 15, 1969) is a British-American actress. She is best known for her role as Fiona Clarke in the NBC television drama series Manifest (2018–2019).

Early life
Faridany was born in San Francisco, California to British parents and was raised near the Ashdown Forest in East Sussex. She graduated from Drama Centre London in 1992.

Career
Her acting career began in 1999, when she appeared in Guiding Light.

Her television appearances include FBI, Law & Order: Special Victims Unit, ER, Bull and Homeland.

She appeared as the museum director in the critically acclaimed 2018 Marvel Cinematic Universe superhero film Black Panther.

Faridany appeared as Fiona Clarke in the NBC drama series Manifest.

She also works in theater productions. In 2019, she, along with Kate Mulgrew, appeared in the play The Half-Life of Marie Curie, which played off-Broadway's Minetta Lane Theatre in the fall.

Personal life
Faridany married the American writer and director, Stephen Wadsworth, in Garda, Italy in 2002.

Filmography

Film

Television

References

External links

1969 births
American film actresses
American television actresses
American expatriates in England
Alumni of the Drama Centre London
20th-century American actresses
21st-century American actresses
Actresses from San Francisco
People from San Francisco
Living people